Annette Feldt Jörnlind (born 1 May 1962 in Västerås, Sweden) is a Swedish female curler. 

Teams

Women's

Mixed

Mixed doubles

Personal life
Annette Jörnlind married fellow curler Thomas Feldt in 2006.

References

External links
 

Living people
1962 births
Sportspeople from Västerås
Swedish female curlers